American Academy Of Microbiology - now American Society for Microbiology
American Association of Oriental Medicine - became American Association of Acupuncture and Oriental Medicine
American Academy of Occupational Medicine - became American College of Occupational and Environmental Medicine
American Academy of Oral Medicine
Alternativna Akademska Obrazovna Mreza
American Association Of Museums
American Association of Orthopedic Medicine
Association of Assessing Officers of Manitoba
Asia Academy of Management
Australian Aboriginal Outreach Ministries
Autism Alliance of Michigan